The Trans-Am Series presented by Pirelli is a sports car racing series held in North America. Founded in 1966, it is sanctioned by the Sports Car Club of America (SCCA). Primarily based in the United States, the series competes on a variety of track types including road courses and street circuits. Trans-Am is split into the TA and TA2 classes for silhouette racing cars, while its production classes are the GT (grand touring), SGT (super grand touring), and XGT (extreme grand touring).

It was known as the CRC Chemicals Trans-Am Championship (1981–1983), the SCCA Budweiser Trans-Am Championship (1983–1984), the SCCA Bendix Brakes Trans-Am Championship (1985–1987), the SCCA Escort Trans-Am Series (1988) the SCCA Liquid Tide Trans-Am Tour (1991), the SCCA Tide Trans-Am Tour (1992), the NTB Trans-Am Series (1998), the BFGoodrich Trans-Am Series (1999–2000), the Trans-Am Series for the BFGoodrich Cup (2001–2002), the Motorock Trans-Am Tour for the BFGoodrich Cup (2003), the Motorock Trans-Am Series (2004), and the Muscle Milk SCCA Trans-Am Series (2009).

Origins

The Trans-Am Series was created in 1966 by Sports Car Club of America (SCCA) President John Bishop. Originally known as the Trans-American Sedan Championship, the name was changed to the Trans-American Championship for 1967 and henceforth.  The series has in fact gone by at least twenty different names through the years. Some were linked to sponsors, some not. It has evolved over time from its original format as a Manufacturers' Championship series for modified passenger sedans and coupés to its current form as a Drivers' / Manufacturers' Championship Series that is open to GT style racecars. Champion drivers have been officially recognized, and Drivers' Championships awarded since the 1972 season. The series was cancelled after 2006 but was revived in 2009, using SCCA GT-1 based cars.

Over the years, the series has raced on a variety of different types of race tracks (Permanent and temporary road courses / street circuits / airport circuits) all over the country, as well as at venues in Canada, Mexico, and even San Juan, Puerto Rico in 2003. Since 2015, Trans Am has been a national series (Continental U.S. only), racing at tracks primarily throughout the East Coast, South, and Midwest. In 2017, the new stand-alone West Coast Championship was added to the Trans-Am Series. Currently, there are six races on the schedule, two of which are joint, or "shared" races with the national Championship series, in which drivers from both championship series race together in the same races, but only earn points in the championship series that they are entered in. The Trans Am series also awards the Northern Cup and Southern Cup which give points in certain races of the national series for competitors who do not run the full season.

Current series format

Tire suppliers and presenting sponsor
In 2017, Pirelli became the exclusive tire supplier (replacing Hoosier Racing Tire) and presenting sponsor for the Trans Am Series, and all classes use Pirelli P ZERO radial ply racing slicks. The change from bias ply tires to Pirelli P ZERO radial tires has been very well received, and has resulted in faster average speeds and improved lap times in all four classes.

Schedules 
In late 2016, the Trans Am Race Company (TARC) announced that after a long absence, the Trans Am Series would return to the West Coast with the 2017 Trans Am West Coast Championship, partnering with the Sportscar Vintage Racing Association (SVRA). The West Coast Championship Series consists of a separate 3 race competition, plus one round that is shared with the Trans Am Championship Series at Circuit of the Americas. (3 permanent road courses / 1 temporary road course)

For 2017, the schedule was reorganized, with five race venues (Homestead-Miami Speedway, Road Atlanta, Watkins Glen, Virginia International Raceway, and New Jersey Motorsports Park) receiving new dates, the Indianapolis Motor Speedway being added, and Louisiana's NOLA Motorsports Park being dropped.

For 2018, the Brainerd, MN and New Jersey Motorsports Park races were dropped, and a race at the Pittsburgh International Race Complex was added for the TA, TA3, and TA4 classes only. There are now 12 race venues on the Trans Am Championship Series schedule (8 permanent road courses / 3 temporary road courses / 1 temporary street circuit), with the Chevrolet Detroit Grand Prix presented by Lear race being open to TA2 class cars only. There are actually 13 actual races on the schedule, as the TA2 cars race twice in Detroit.

For 2018, the West Coast Championship's race at Willow Springs, CA was dropped, Sonoma, CA was added, and a shared race at INDY was added, expanding their series to a separate 3 round competition, plus two shared races (3 permanent road courses / 2 temporary road courses).

The schedule for 2019 continues to be 12 races long (including two "shared events" with the West Coast Championship Series), but the mid-April Homestead, Florida race date changes to an early May event at Weathertech Raceway, Laguna Seca, California—the first time the series has raced there since 2004. The early August Pittsburgh race was also dropped, having been replaced by the Memorial Day Motorsports Festival at Connecticut's Lime Rock Park, the first time the series will have raced there in three years, and it will be the thirtieth time overall. Additionally, the Indianapolis race weekend moves from mid-June to early August, and the "shared" Circuit of the Americas (COTA) race weekend moves from early November back to early October. The Chevrolet Detroit Grand Prix presented by Lear moves from early June to May 31—June 2, just four days after the event at Lime Rock Park ends. The season finale at Daytona International Speedway moves up one week to mid-November.

On the 2019 West Coast Championship schedule, the season is one race longer (6), and opens a couple of weeks earlier at Willows, California's Thunderhill Raceway Park. The shared event at Laguna Seca takes place in early May, with Sonoma moving from early June to mid-June, replacing the shared event at the Indianapolis Motor Speedway. The shared event at Circuit of the Americas (CoTA) moves from early November to early October.

For 2020, the season finale at Daytona was dropped due to unresolvable scheduling conflicts, and after a two-year absence, the race at Brainerd, Minnesota was reinstated to honor the late Jed Copham, the track's co-owner and part time Trans Am Series driver. The season's grand finale in both series will now be the shared event at Circuit Of The Americas (CoTA), with that race being moved from October to November. The Indianapolis race is the only event that is open to all competitors who are registered to race in the Trans Am Championship series, or either of the regional sub-championship series. In the West Coast Championship series, the season will start one month earlier (mid-March) at Sonoma Raceway, which will for the first time ever also hold a second race in late August to make up for the Auto Club Speedway race being dropped. Other than this and minor reordering, the schedule remains at six races, with Laguna Seca as the other shared event with both series racing together.

On March 17, 2020, the Road Atlanta round was forced to be postponed due to the coronavirus outbreak. This was the start of a series of postponements and cancellations that lead to a revised schedule being announced on April 7, 2020. In this schedule, the Detroit round was dropped reducing the series to an 11-round championship. Unfortunately the planned restart of the series at Indianapolis Motor Speedway was also postponed with a new date for the track still to be determined and the series resuming at Mid-Ohio Sports Car Course instead. The rounds at Watkins Glen and Lime Rock Park were the final casualties of the outbreak with late cancellations leading to double headers at Virginia International Raceway and Road Atlanta.

In 2021, for the first time since 2017, the series will return to Homestead-Miami Speedway. Trans-Am will also be having its first ever race at the newly renovated Charlotte Motor Speedway Roval and a TA2-only round at the inaugural running of the Music City Grand Prix on the streets of Nashville. No double-headers are scheduled to return following their appearances in 2020; however, all tracks that were featured on the preliminary 2020 calendar are scheduled for 2021 as well. For the first time in series history, Trans-Am instituted a drop-round system where competitors can choose to drop their two worst round results including non-appearances that took place before August 1.

Car classifications

Tube-frame / silhouette body

TA

TA class cars are high-performance Grand Touring race cars with a tubular chassis and a Cadillac CTS-V, Chevrolet Camaro (Gen 6), Dodge Challenger (Gen 3), or Ford Mustang (Gen 6) body (full-scale replica) built by Advanced Composite Products or Derhaag Motorsports (Corvette C7 / Camaro Gen 6). All body types are eligible from the first year of production of the street car to five years after production ends. After each body model's full eligibility ends, each body will be partially eligible for an additional five years, and may be used in up to five races per year of eligibility. Cars may use a single-element rear wing. (Older body styles may continue to be used in the; West Coast Championship, Northern Regional Cup, and Southern Regional Cup for an additional 10-years after partial-eligibility for the National Championship has ended. Cars using a Trans Am approved body model with bodies from alternate manufacturers that are approved to run in the SCCA Club GT1 class may be approved to run in the West Coast Championship, Northern Regional Cup, or Southern Regional Cup on a case-by-case basis.)

Power comes from overhead valve (two per cylinder), pushrod, naturally aspirated, carbureted (single 4-barrel) 366 cubic inch (5.99 L) V8 engines producing 850+ horsepower. The minimum base weight is 2,780 pounds. Current rules allow for the use of leaded gasoline, whereas all other classes except XGT must use unleaded gas. Automatic transmissions are prohibited, and manual transmissions must have no more than five forward gear ratios, as well as a functional reverse gear. Sequential shifting transmissions are permitted, as well as commercially available No-Lift Shift (NLS) systems, and also "auto-blip" RPM matching systems for downshifting. Traction Control systems or devices that function independently of the driver are strictly prohibited, as is ABS (Anti-skid Braking System).

TA2 
TA2 class rules specify a tubular chassis built by Howe Racing Enterprises, Mike Cope Racing, M-1 Motorsports, or Meissen Enterprises, and a Chevrolet Camaro (Gen 5 & 6), Ford Mustang (Gen 5 & 6) or Dodge Challenger (Gen 3) body (full-scale replica) built by either Five Star Racing Race Car Bodies (Gen 6 Camaros / Mustangs), or Howe Racing Enterprises (all other eligible cars). The minimum base weight (including driver and any driver gear) for all cars is 2,830 pounds. The costs of shock absorbers, brake calipers & pads, and wheels are controlled, and no titanium or carbon fiber components are allowed. Only the driver's seat and Derhaag single plane rear wing may be constructed using carbon fiber. TA2 is currently Trans Am's most popular class among competitors.

TA2 engines are similar to TA engines, except that they must be supplied by a Trans Am Approved and Certified Engine Builder/Rebuilder, and use fuel injection rather than a carburetor, as well as a Trans Am certified inlet restrictor plate, as maximum power is limited to 490 HP and 447 lb-ft of torque. Engines must comply with all TA2 engine regulations, and are sealed by the builder/rebuilder. As per current rules, "Nothing may direct or force air to the filter or housing." Transmissions must be commercially available, "H pattern" manual units with four forward gear ratios (1:1 fourth gear ratio, and no overdrive) and a reverse gear. Sequential shift mechanisms are not allowed, nor are shift-without-lift mechanisms. Traction Control devices or systems that function independently of the driver are strictly prohibited, as is ABS (Anti-skid Braking System).

Production based

XGT
New for 2020, the Xtreme Grand Touring (XGT) class will be used for former FIA Group GT3 cars whose homologation has expired under SRO and FIA regulations. During the 2019 Indianapolis Motor Speedway round, an Audi R8 whose GT3 homologation had expired was placed in the SGT class. After Trans Am Series officials and owners of former GT3 cars that could not be raced in a GT3 series following the expiration of the car's GT3 homologation had discussions, the series' officials announced that for the 2020 season, the "Xtreme Grand Touring" class will be part of the series. All original period-correct GT3 specifications will be enforced, and the series intends for 2016 and earlier cars that have had expired homologations to participate.

SGT

This class is intended to be a place for "... sports cars, grand touring cars, performance coupes, and performance sedans, all with their varying engines and drivetrain layouts..." to race. Unlike GT class cars, the current rules allow them to compete at a higher level of vehicle preparation. Some engines are required to have restrictor plates, for the purpose of equalizing performance. SGT class cars must be of a number of different specified domestic or foreign makes, models, and year of manufacture, from American "muscle cars", such as Chevy Corvettes and Camaros, Dodge Challengers and Vipers, and Ford Mustangs to European exotics like Aston Martins, Ferraris, Ginettas, Ligiers, McLarens, Mercedes-AMGs, Lamborghinis, Maseratis, Panozes, and Porsches, as well as Asian exotics, such as Acura NSXs. Eligible cars up to fifteen years old will now be able to race in the series, and for five years after that, partially eligible cars will be able to race in up to six races per year of eligibility. Standard body appearance must be maintained, including the OEM grille and badge. Aftermarket or OEM rear wings are allowed. As with GT, Tube frames are not allowed, but roll cages are mandatory. Minimum Vehicle Base Weights may be changed for the same purpose.

GT

This class complies more with the classic Trans Am standards of "the glory era", and is the entry-level class of the three production-based classes within the Trans Am Series. "All vehicles must be production based, whether mass-production or limited-production, or a "kit car" that matches the look and performance of the GT class, and is available to the general public" (including 'track specific' models), such as Ford Mustangs, Chevrolet Camaros, Dodge Vipers, Nissan 350Zs, Porsche Caymans, or Mercedes-AMGs, and many more. The class is intended to be a competition between late model, nearly stock, high-performance cars, and it's a good place for Trans Am Series beginners to start racing in. As with the SGT class, there is a fifteen-year period of full eligibility, and a five-year period of partial eligibility for eligible makes and models where a maximum of six races may be run. OEM rear spoilers/wings may be used.  As with SGT, some engines are required to have approved restrictor plates, for the purpose of equalizing performance. Minimum Vehicle Base Weights are adjusted depending on optional components used.

Event protocol

Direction of travel
In the Trans Am Series (as well as the West Coast Series), the direction of travel on the racetrack is up to each race facility. It is usually "clockwise" (right to left, as viewed from outside the track), except at Circuit Of The Americas, and WeatherTech Raceway Laguna Seca.

Sound limit
As stated in the current Rule Book, "All vehicles must meet the sound requirements of 115 dBA, or less. Certain tracks may have lower sound limits. If so, and if the series is unable to obtain a waiver, the lower sound limit will be published in the supplemental regulations. Cars exceeding the sound limit on-track will be black flagged and not allowed to continue competing until the sound generated by that car is brought within spec."

Exterior lighting
As stated in the rule book, operable headlight assemblies are recommended for all cars competing in any class, but are only mandatory in the production (XGT, SGT, and GT) classes. The lenses may be clear or yellow tinted. An operational low and high beam is recommended, and brightness may be greater than stock.

A minimum of one fully functional rear brake light, and also at least one fully functional tail/rain light in its/their approximate (TA2 only; all others: stock location) stock location(s) is required on all cars competing in the Trans Am Series. It/they must be plainly visible and unobscured, and the brake light(s) must function just as it/they would on a production car. Brightness may be greater than stock, but not so bright as to be confused with brake lights.

Testing / practice / qualifying / tire marking / race length
Prior to each race, there are two test sessions, one practice session, and at least one qualifying session. As per the current Trans Am rule book, "All cars must compete on Pirelli tires as listed in the current year Trans Am Tire Fitment List." Each car has four dry tires per car marked by the Trans Am Technical Staff prior to qualifying. "All cars shall start the race on the same set of marked dry tires that they qualified on. This includes when a qualifying session contained changing conditions where dry and wet tires were used." Treating / modifying tires in any way, or warming them is strictly prohibited. Scraping off rubber buildup (clag) on the surface of any tires is permitted.

Since the 1975 season, Trans Am races are ~100 miles in length, but not less. As stated in the current Rule Book, "The normal race length of Trans Am Championship, Presented by Pirelli Races is 100 miles (including the lap that completes the 100 mile length) unless otherwise specified in the Supplemental Regulations or otherwise changed by the CHIEF STEWARD during the course of the event weekend". "As directed by the CHIEF STEWARD, the SERIES TIMEKEEPER will keep the official time and distance and will announce whether the race will be a time, or distance, competition, along with the laps remaining." "The CHIEF STEWARD may designate a maximum length of time in which the race must be completed (e.g. 20 laps/60 miles, or 45 minutes, whichever comes first). Regardless of the race format, finishers will be determined by the total number of laps completed, and who finished them first."

Pits, weather and tyres
Trans Am Series race cars carry enough fuel to run the entire race non-stop, making each race a 100-mile sprint that is a test of driver skill and competitiveness. Current rules require TA class cars to use 112 octane, leaded gasoline. TA2, SGT, and GT class cars must use unleaded, 98 octane gas. XGT class cars may use either leaded or unleaded gas. (All fuel is supplied exclusively by Sunoco Race Fuels) Fuel containers and/or refueling on pit lane, or the grid is strictly prohibited. Fueling / refueling is only permitted in the team's paddock space. The use of Nitrous Oxide (or other similar compounds or systems), fuel additives, and/or fuel cooling (in car or not) is prohibited in all classes. Supercharging or turbocharging is only permitted in the XGT, SGT, and GT classes when the original homologation (GT3 for XGT cars) was certified with such.

Pit stops are neither needed nor required, other than for the purpose of changing over to rain tires, or for some other mechanical or other issue. The pit lane speed limit is 45 miles per hour during testing / practice / qualifying / race sessions.

Teams are only allowed to change one dry tire, any time after qualifying begins, without penalty. If a team changes more than one marked dry tire after the qualifying session begins, that car will lose all qualifying times. Once the race has started, any number of tires may be changed without penalty. Changing over to or from rain tires is up to each car's crew chief, and is not limited.

All Trans Am by Pirelli races go on even if it rains or has rained, and all cars must be able to race safely during wet sessions. Depending on conditions, drivers may choose to pit and change over to softer, treaded rain tires. If conditions change from dry to wet after the race has started, the Safety Car may be dispatched in order for race control to determine what actions may be necessary, or the Black Flag may be waved to allow all cars to enter the pits and make any and all necessary changes in order to race under wet conditions. All cars will return to the track in the positions they were before the Black Flag, and the race will be restarted.

A minimum of one operational windshield wiper, and also a windshield defogging/demisting system (or anti-fog films) that can keep the windshield clear during wet sessions must be installed on all cars, and used when necessary. The wiper blades and arms may be removed for dry sessions.

A minimum of one fully functional headlight must be used during rain/fog/spray/twilight sessions. Rain/tail lights must be used during rain/fog sessions, and/or during twilight sessions, and any time the track is wet enough to produce spray.

Multiple class race starting grid
TA, XGT, SGT, and GT class cars all "grid" (take the positions they will start the race in with the 2 fastest qualifiers on the front row, and all other slower cars behind them according to qualifying times, with the fastest qualifier having their choice of left or right position) and race together during the same "race session" using a staggered start with the three progressively slower classes starting their respective races (in order of class - fastest to slowest) behind the TA class grid, and being separated from each other. The front row for the next class must be approximately 500 feet behind the last car of the class in front (or as otherwise directed). TA2 class cars have their own separate race.

Race start and finish
The series uses a rolling start with the pace car setting the pace lap speed as it approaches the starter at the start and finish line, who uses a green flag to signal the start of the race for each class in a multi-class race (or the TA2 class). Cars take their positions behind the pace car according to the official starting grid. In the absence of a pace car for a multi-class race, the "pole" car for each class will serve the same function as the pace car from its position in the front row.  If the green flag is not waved, and additional pace laps are required, those pace laps do not count toward the scheduled race distance. "If the additional pace lap(s) causes the race session to expire before the full-race distance is reached, the session will be shortened instead of counting pace laps as part of the race."

At the completion of the last lap, the Starter waves a black and white checkered flag, signifying the end of the race. All drivers must exit the course after taking the checkered flag. All winning drivers, as well as second and third-place finishers (plus any award winners announced over the official race control frequency) are required to attend the Winner's Circle ceremonies at the victory podium / rostrum.

Flags / safety car
The series uses race control flags (six "advisory" / seven  "mandatory compliance"), which are waved at a number of Flag Stations around the track, to communicate with competitors during all qualifying, practice, and race sessions. Flags may be replaced by lights and/or reflective panels, which will have the same meaning as flags. The "Safety Car" may be dispatched for additional race control, and is always used to lead the field during all Double Yellow Flag periods. All restarts are single file.

Advisory flags
 GREEN: Displayed by the starter to indicate the beginning or resumption of a session, and/or that the course is clear.
BLACK AND WHITE DIVIDED DIAGONALLY: Shown once only to the driver with a number board from the Starter as a warning for unsportsmanlike conduct.
 BLUE WITH YELLOW DIAGONAL or SOLID BLUE: Motionless - A competitor is following you and possibly trying to pass / Waved - Another competitor may be quickly overtaking you / Both - Drive with caution and sportsmanlike courtesy; Give other drivers room. Do not make any sudden directional changes.
 YELLOW WITH RED STRIPES: Caution - the racing surface may be affected by debris and/or fluids.
 WHITE: Caution - you are approaching a slow moving vehicle.
 WHITE WAVED AT START/FINISH LINE: Last lap of competition.

Mandatory compliance flags
 BLACK: Shown to the Driver with a number board from the Starter and/or at designated flag station(s) on the circuit. The Driver must report to Series Officials on pit lane for consultation and/or penalty within four laps or face possible additional disciplinary actions.
BLACK FLAG ALL: When the black flag is shown at all flag stations, the session has been stopped. Use caution and proceed to pit lane. No passing. Cars are to line up at pit out, against the outer pit wall, and are under impound conditions.
 BLACK WITH ORANGE DISC IN CENTER: Shown to the Driver with a number board from the Starter and/or at designated flag stations on the circuit to advise of a mechanical problem that may endanger the Driver or other competitors. Driver must report immediately to their assigned pit at reduced speed and may not rejoin the session until released by the Technical Director or his designee.
YELLOW: Incident in the area covered by the flag - Use caution! - Reduce speed and line up in single file - No passing between the yellow flag and the incident.
WAVED YELLOW: Serious incident(s) in the area covered by the flag(s); Track may be partially or completely blocked - Use great caution! No passing between (first) yellow flag(s) and the (last) incident(s).
DOUBLE YELLOW: Full course caution - Slow down! - No passing.
 RED: Serious incident - The course is significantly blocked – Slow down! - No passing - Proceed immediately to the next flag station and stop.
BLACK AND WHITE CHECKERED: Completion of practice, qualifying, or race - All cars must exit the course once they have taken the checkered flag.

In January 2018, the Trans Am Race Company (TARC) announced that it had "...reached an agreement with Audible Flagging Systems (AFS), now the Official Flagging System Provider of the Trans Am Series presented by Pirelli. AFS, the industry leader for in-car race flagging systems, will be installed in all Trans Am race cars to warn drivers of caution flags immediately and simultaneously. The system is proven to also minimize secondary collisions, which can be particularly dangerous and damaging."

"The onboard system not only flashes a brilliant yellow light inside the car but also emits an audible warning tone to alert competitors of caution conditions." The new in-car flagging system will be installed free of charge to all Trans Am Series competitors to keep the cost of racing in the series in check. Additionally, the new system is supplemental, and does not replace Race Control, driver spotters, or corner workers (flaggers).

Driver conduct
As the current rule book states; "All competitors have a right to “racing room” on the marked racing surface. “Racing room” is defined as; sufficient space to allow a competitor to maintain control of his car in close quarters under racing conditions. It is the responsibility of all drivers to avoid contact between cars. Any position improvement gained by a car that initiates “avoidable contact” will be reversed. If a position advantage was gained, and for some reason was not given back, the car that gained the advantage may be placed behind the car that was disadvantaged by the “avoidable contact” on the Timing and Scoring results. Other penalties may also be assessed as determined appropriate by the CHIEF STEWARD. The above will be considered when determining the appropriate penalty for avoidable contact." "Shortcutting" the racecourse, as well as unsportsmanlike / abnormal driving, such as hindering, crowding, or blocking another driver or drivers will not be tolerated, and the driver will be penalized accordingly.

Championships and awards
Originally, Manufacturers' Championship points were awarded in all classes to the top 6 finishing positions of each make of car: 9-6-4-3-2-1. Beginning in 1972, the SCCA instituted a Drivers' Championship that would be based on overall finishing position from 1st through 10th places: 20-15-12-10-8-6-4-3-2-1. Beginning in 1990, the top 25 finishers were awarded points as follows: 30-27-25-23-21-19-18-17-16-15-14-13-12-11-10-9-8-7-6-5-4-3-2-1-1.

Currently, Manufacturers' Championship points are earned in exactly the same manner as they were originally. (*Vehicles must be classified as finishers to score Manufacturers' points.) Final point standings ties will be decided by which manufacturer has more wins, second-place finishes, etc., as necessary to determine the winner.

Series Champions in each of the four competition classes are determined based on points accumulated during the season. Drivers' Championship points are awarded as follows: At each race, after Qualifying has been completed, 3 points are awarded to the First Qualifier, 2 to the Second Qualifier, and 1 to the Third Qualifier. The top 24 finishers in each class, at each race are awarded points as follows: 30-27-25-23-21-20-19-18-17-16-15-14-13-12-11-10-9-8-7-6-5-4-3-2. All other finishers are awarded 1 point, provided the driver is classified as a starter. After the first green flag lap of a race, 1 point is awarded to any driver leading a lap in class, as well as 1 point for leading the most laps in class for each race. "In the event qualifying was not held due to any reason, Drivers Championship points will not be awarded." (A driver must be classified as a starter to score Championship points.)

The West Coast Championship Series operates just like the national championship. Points earned at shared events only count toward the series that the driver / team is currently entered in. If a race counts toward more than one championship series, a driver wishing to earn points for more than one championship must formally enter each series.

After the results of each race are "final", the COOLSHIRT Systems "Cool Move of the Race" Award (If applicable, it is given to the outstanding driver of the race, and the "move" could also be a 'move up through the field'.), pitboxes.com Crew Award, and Traq Gear Crew Chief Award are given out.

Series Champions are awarded the brand new for 2017 Trigon Trophy (sponsored by 3-Dimensional Services Group, and custom designed by longtime partner Crystal Sensations). According to The Trans Am Race Company, LLC President John Claggett, "The base is shaped as a “D”...  The crystal is essentially 3 sided... thus... the Trigon Trophy reflects the sponsorship. And yes... They are beautiful." The Trans Am Series' traditional colors are red and black, and Pirelli's color is yellow, with The Trigon Trophies incorporating those design elements.

2018 introduced the Northern Cup and Southern Cup Regional sub-championships for teams that either do not wish to, or cannot run the entire race schedule, and have run a limited number of races in the past. There are very specific requirements for entry into the regional championships, as they are intended to allow drivers to try competing in the series before committing to running the full schedule of events. A driver / team may earn points in one or both championship series, or either the Northern or Southern Cup sub-championship series, but not in both a sub-championship series and also a championship series.

Also new for 2018 is the Master's Championship, which is intended to recognize drivers still actively competing on the racetrack who are over 65 years of age. Again, the points schedule for driver's championship points will be used. The highest finishing Master's Championship driver in each class will be recognized during the podium ceremony after each race. At the end of the year, the top three Master's Championship drivers in each regional series will be recognized at the series awards banquet.

Rookie of the Year winners in each class are also determined by points accumulated during the season.

New for 2018 is the Trans Am Team Championship, with points being awarded to each car/car number. Multiple drivers may compete in the same car / car number in order to earn points towards the Team Championship. The number of points earned follows the same methodology as in the Driver's Championship (according to finishing position), but as the rule book states, "In addition to the points earned on-track, teams will be judged by several factors that embody a professional team and help promote, and improve, the Series".

For the 2021 season, the Trans Am Series in partnership with the Sports Car Club of America created the Pro/Am Challenge. The Pro/Am Challenge allows SCCA drivers to compete in Trans Am using the 2021 SCCA road racing rulebook for their cars, making the transition back and forth between the SCCA Road Racing program and Trans Am much easier. This secondary championship is open to all five Trans Am classes and the primary SCCA classes that fit into these Trans Am classes are GT1, GT2, GTX, T1, T2, T3 and STO. The various cars are balanced into the correct Trans Am class with minor weight and restrictor changes. The Pro/Am Challenge requires competitors to compete in the two specific Pro/Am Challenge rounds and pick four other Trans Am Series or West Coast Trans Am Series races in which they will earn points. Points are awarded using the same system as the main Trans Am Series championship.

*See current rule book for complete information on all Trans Am Series rules and regulations.

Manufacturers / drivers championships

National championship

NOTE:  In 1980, the Sports Car Club of America retroactively named an overall drivers' championships for all pre-1972 seasons, using the points system of the time to calculate drivers' championships.  The SCCA and the Trans-Am Series now recognise these drivers as series champions.

West coast championship

Class championships by manufacturer

Other series based on the format
The Trans-Am Series has used tube-frame / silhouette cars, similar to the original IMSA GT Series, since the early 1980s, with heavy emphasis on GT cars. The SCCA Pro Racing World Challenge and Continental Tire Sports Car Challenge racing series, run by the Sports Car Club of America (SCCA), and the International Motor Sports Association (IMSA), respectively, utilize modified production-based cars, sports cars, and touring cars, similar in spirit to the Trans-Am Series since the 1980s.  With the rise of these other series, Trans-Am saw decreased attention from the media, however, Speedvision did occasionally cover Trans-Am races until the series' demise in 2006.

Trans-Am a international series outside USA, Trans Am Australia.

See also
 List of Trans-Am Series marques
 Trans-Am production cars

References

External links
 

 
Sports car racing series
Sports Car Club of America
Group GT3